North East Derbyshire is a local government district in Derbyshire, England.  It borders the districts of Chesterfield, Bolsover, Amber Valley and Derbyshire Dales in Derbyshire, and Sheffield and Rotherham in South Yorkshire. The population of the district as taken at the 2011 Census was 99,023.

The district council is a non-constituent partner member of the Sheffield City Region Combined Authority. The district is a non-constituent member of the Sheffield City Region and shares a membership along with neighbouring Derbyshire Dales, Borough of Chesterfield, Bolsover District and Bassetlaw District in Nottinghamshire. The district is also part of The Derby, Derbyshire, Nottingham and Nottinghamshire Local Enterprise Partnership.

Settlements in the district include:
 Arkwright Town and Ashover
 Barlow
 Calow and Clay Cross
 Dronfield
 Eckington
 Grassmoor
 Holmesfield, Holymoorside and Holmewood
 Killamarsh
 Morton
 North Wingfield
 Pilsley
 Renishaw and Ridgeway
 Shirland, Spinkhill and Stonebroom
 Tupton
 Wingerworth

The district was formed on 1 April 1974 under the Local Government Act 1972. It was a merger of the Clay Cross and Dronfield urban districts along with all but one parish of Chesterfield Rural District.

Coal mining

The district, along with the district of Bolsover and much of the surrounding area of South Yorkshire, was a major producer of coal when a large seam was discovered during the building of the Clay Cross railway tunnel. Coal mining became the main industry in the region. During the 1980s the Conservative government closed down many of the mines after a dispute between the government and the National Union of Mineworkers, which is known as the miners' strike.

The strike began when the government reneged on previous declarations and announced the closure of the majority of pits due to unprofitability and inefficiency. The strike lasted for a year between 1984 and 1985. The strike was observed by approximately 70% of miners in North East Derbyshire. It caused massive social upheaval as traditionally close-knit communities became divided between those who worked and those who did not. Striking miners went unpaid and were not entitled to state welfare benefits, meaning that thousands of families relied on handouts and poverty became rife.

The strike was resolved by the spring of 1985 when the government effectively defeated the NUM and continued its policy of mine closures. The closure of the pits resulted in the closure of many associated industries, which decimated the local communities. Many former pit villages have struggled to recover. There are now no deep pit mines left in North East Derbyshire.

Regeneration
Following the closure of the pits there were large areas of the district left derelict, with old mine workings and spoil tips from the last 150 years of industrialization. Over the last few years these sites have been re-mediated and regenerated by open cast mining of the remaining surface deposits and reclamation of coal from the old spoil heaps. The sites have then been restored as a mix of parkland, business parks, and housing sites. A lot of the work is part-funded by EEC Coalfield community regeneration grants, to provide money to help clean up the environmental legacy and fund the creation of job opportunities by providing the infrastructure for developments. This has resulted in several large and some smaller business parks, now providing jobs for thousands of people, albeit not of the same skill level as the engineering jobs lost. A lot being warehousing and distribution, as opposed to the old engineering trades.

Council

Arms

References

 
Non-metropolitan districts of Derbyshire